Vale de Madeiros is a village located in the parish of Canas de Senhorim, municipality of Nelas, district of Viseu, sub-region of Dão-Lafões, region Centro, in Portugal.

History 
In the Kingdom's Population Registry (Cadastro da População do Reino, in Portuguese) from 1527, ordered by the King John III of Portugal, 171 houses (fogos, in 16th century Portuguese) were registered, 18 of those in the village (lugar, in 16th century Portuguese) of Vall de Madeyrus (Vale de Madeiros, in 16th century Portuguese).

Cultural Associations 
 Rosas do Mondego Folklore Group.

Sports Associations 
 Sport Vale de Madeiros e Benfica (SVMB).

Schools 
 Nursery and Primary School (ages up to 10): Escola Basica do 1.º Ciclo de Vale de Madeiros. 
Against the will of local population and local authorities, the central government ordered its closure in the school year of 2014/2015 and thereafter.

Sports Facilities 
 Campo da Gatuna: Football Field of Vale de Madeiros, funded in 1975.

Heritage 
  Penedo da Penha 1 and 2, Complex 1 and 2 of Shelters and Cavities, dated from the 3rd and 2nd millenniums BC, Neolithic, Chalcolithic and Bronze Age, located 1 km south of Vale de Madeiros, on the River Mondego Valley.
  Cross of Vale de Medeiros, located in Vale de Madeiros, Rua da Ladeira.
  Chapel of Saint Nicholas, Capela de São Nicolau, located in Vale de Madeiros, Rua Direita and Rua Chão de Monteiro, from 1732.
  Chapel of Saint John the Baptist, Capela de São João Baptista, located in Vale de Madeiros, Rua da Capela, from the 16th century.

List of streets 
 Beco da Ladeira
  Beco dos Chões
  Rua Chão do Monteiro
  Rua da Capela
  Rua da Carvalha
  Rua da Escola
  Rua da Ladeira
  Rua da Lage
  Rua da Lameira
  Rua da Urtigueira
  Rua das Contenças
  Rua de São José
  Rua Direita
  Rua do Campo de Futebol
  Rua do Pátio
  Rua dos Olivais
  Travessa da Escola
  Travessa das Contenças
  Travessa de São Nicolao

References

Nelas
Villages in Portugal